Pal Heights is a shopping mall located at Jayadev Vihar, Bhubaneswar in the state of Odisha, India. It has a floor area of two hundred thousand square feet. Opened in 2008, the mall is one of the largest malls in Odisha. The mall is next to the Pal Heights Hotel in Jaydev Vihar, a neighborhood of Bhubaneswar.  
It contains approximately 50 outlets, including cafeterias, food courts, and restaurants as well as parking spaces and a hypermarket.

Specifications
100% Power Backup
Fire Fighting System
HVAC and AHU
RCC Framed Earthquake Resistant

Features

Leisure
Plaza

Hospitality
Cafeteria
Food Court 
Restaurants

Business
Office Spaces

Others
Departmental Anchors  
Hypermarket

References

Shopping malls in Bhubaneswar
Shopping malls established in 2008
2008 establishments in Orissa